Yegemen Qazaqstan (Sovereign Kazakhstan) is a government owned Kazakh language newspaper published from Kazakhstan. It was first published on 17 December 1919. The newspaper was started by the ministry of information and public accord.

See also
Mass media in Kazakhstan

References

External links 
Yegemen Qazaqstan Official Site
Kazakhstan press and newspapers

1919 establishments in Russia
Communist newspapers
Kazakh-language newspapers
Newspapers published in Kazakhstan
Publications established in 1919
Recipients of the Order of the Red Banner of Labour
State media